Armenakan may refer to:

Armenakan Party, an Armenian underground organization in the Ottoman Empire established in 1885
Armenian Democratic Liberal Party (ADL), an Armenian party, successor to the Armenakan Party formed in 1921, not to be confused with the Democratic Liberal Party of Armenia (ADLA)
Armenakan-Democratic Liberal Party, an Armenian party established in 2009 as a splinter group from the ADL
Armenakan Party (Nagorno-Karabakh), a regional party in Nagorno-Karabakh